Chak Hamid is a village situated in the Pind Dadan Khan Tehsil of Jhelum District, of Punjab, Pakistan. Its geographical coordinates are 32° 37' 60 North and 73° 12' 0 East.

Most of the population is Muslim, and most of them belong to Jalap Rajput.

References 

Populated places in Jhelum District